MoEngage is a customer engagement platform, headquartered in San Francisco, California, United States, with offices in Bengaluru, Jakarta, London, and Berlin, founded in 2014.

History 
The company was founded in 2014 by IIT Kharagpur alumni, Raviteja Dodda and Yashwanth Kumar.

Products 
MoEngage launched a product called NATIV in March 2016 to "help create personalized in-app experiences in minutes". MoEngage also launched Smart Triggers, a mechanism for delivering one-to-one personalized push notifications.

In August 2016, MoEngage launched its "Web Marketing Suite" which included email, web push, and in-app messaging.

In January 2018, the company launched a new product called Dynamic Product Messaging (DPM) that sent personalized product recommendations across channels based on user behavior.

Funding
In September 2015, MoEngage secured $4.25 million in Series A funding led by Helion Venture Partners with participation from Exfinity, Snapdeal's co-founders Kunal Bahl and Rohit Bansal and Taxi4Sure's founder Raghunandan G. Earlier, the company received seed funding from Helion Venture Partners in 2014 and, in 2016, an undisclosed investment from Facebook's Anand Chandrasekaran.

In December 2018, the company raised $9 million in a Series B funding round led by Matrix Partners and Ventureast.

In February 2020, the company announced a Series C funding of $25 million for its "mobile-first customer engagement platform," led by Eight Roads Ventures, F-Prime Capital, Matrix Partners, and Ventureast.

Recognition 
 MoEngage was listed in the NASSCOM's top 10 hottest start-ups in 2015.
 In 2017, MoEngage was recognized by Gartner as a 'Cool Vendor' in retail merchandising and marketing.
 In 2018 and 2019, the company was recognized by Gartner in their Magic Quadrant for Mobile Marketing Platforms.
 The founder and CEO of MoEngage, Raviteja Dodda, was selected by BW Businessworld for its second edition of 40 Under 40 in 2018, and, in 2016, by Forbes for its 30 Under 30 Asia.

References 

Companies based in San Francisco
Companies established in 2014
Marketing software
Mobile marketing
Technology companies of India
Indian companies established in 2014